Pirelli Tower (Italian: Grattacielo Pirelli – also called "Pirellone", literally "Big Pirelli") is a 32-storey,  skyscraper in Milan, Italy.

Characterized by a structural skeleton, curtain wall façades and tapered sides, it was among the first skyscrapers to abandon the customary block form. After its completion it was the tallest building in Italy but in 1961, Mole Antonelliana recovered priority after rebuilding of its pinnacle. The architectural historian Hasan-Uddin Khan praised it as "one of the most elegant tall buildings in the world" and as one of the "few tall European buildings [that made] statements that added to the vocabulary of the skyscraper".

The building inspired the Pan Am Building (now MetLife Building) in New York and the National Mutual West Plaza in Auckland.

History
In 1950, Alberto Pirelli, president and owner of the giant Pirelli tyre company, ordered that a skyscraper be built in the area where the corporation's first factory was located in the 19th century. The project was developed by architect Gio Ponti, with the assistance of Pier Luigi Nervi and Arturo Danusso.

Construction of the tower began in 1956, when Italy was experiencing an economic boom. The tower was to be surrounded by low lying buildings on a pentagonal plot of land. Upon its completion in 1958, it became a symbol not only of Milan, but also of the economic recovery of Italy after the devastation of World War II. At , it was the tallest building in Italy after Mole Antonelliana until 1995. The company sold the building to the Lombardy regional government in 1978. It's also the seat of the Regional Council.

Incidents

2002 plane crash 

On the afternoon of 18 April 2002, a Rockwell Commander 112 single-engine airplane registered in Switzerland hit the building. The aircraft was apparently scheduled to fly from Locarno to Milan. The plane was low on fuel and Linate Airport was preparing an emergency landing prior to the crash, but the pilot suddenly strayed and crashed into the building. The pilot and two people inside the tower were killed in the accident.  Two goals of the restoration work were to maintain the structural and artistic integrity of the building and to upgrade its status as an executive headquarters by introducing new support services and technological systems.

See also

Architecture of Italy
List of tallest buildings in Italy

References

Further reading

External links

Regione Lombardia – official website

Skyscrapers in Milan
Modernist architecture in Italy
Office buildings completed in 1958
Pirelli
Skyscraper office buildings in Italy
Pier Luigi Nervi buildings